The Dart Kitten was a British-built ultra-light aircraft of the 1930s.

Design and development

The Dart Kitten was designed by A.R. Weyl in 1936 and built by Dart Aircraft Ltd at Dunstable, Bedfordshire.  It is an ultra-light single-seat low-wing aircraft with a fixed tailskid undercarriage. The four examples built were powered by a variety of engines of between 27 h.p. and 40 h.p.

Operational history

The Dart Kitten I G-AERP first flew in January 1937 and was sold to a private owner at Tollerton airport near Nottingham. It was stored during the Second World War. It was re-engined with a 40 h.p. J.A.P. J-99 postwar and flew with a private owner at Broxbourne airfield Hertfordshire before crashing there in November 1952.

The Dart Kitten II G-AEXT received its authorisation to fly on 30 April 1937 and had a series of owners before being badly damaged in a crash at Willingale, Essex in November 1964.  It was subsequently rebuilt and in 2009 was airworthy with a private owner near Aylesbury Buckinghamshire. As of 2012 it is based with the Real Aeroplane Company at Breighton near Selby in North Yorkshire.

The Dart Kitten III G-AMJP was built by Dart Aircraft in January 1952 and was flown by owners in Buckinghamshire, Wiltshire and Lincolnshire before being lost in a crash near Kings Lynn in June 1966.

A fourth Kitten was home-built at Port Moresby New Guinea in 1960 and registered in Australia as VH-WGL.

Variants

 Kitten I  27 h.p. Ava 4A-00 flat four engine;
 Kitten II  36 h.p. Aeronca-J.A.P. J-99 engine, revised rear decking and simplified undercarriage;
 Kitten III  as Kitten II but with wheel brakes.

Specifications (Kitten III)

References

Notes

Bibliography

1930s British sport aircraft
1930s British civil utility aircraft
Kitten
Low-wing aircraft
Single-engined tractor aircraft
Aircraft first flown in 1937